The West Oak Forest Earthlodge Site is a historic site located near Glenwood, Iowa, United States. It was authenticated by the Office of the State Archeologist the following year. This is one of 29 known earthlodges that exist from the Nebraska Phase of the Woodland period. The earthlodges were dwellings that were composed of four central support posts, surrounded by shorter outer wall posts, with wattle and daub walls and roof. The depression in the earth was caused by the natural decay and caving-in of the earthlodge itself. In addition to the depression there have been 231 artifacts found at the site that dates from sometime between 1250 and 1400 C.E.  The site was listed on the National Register of Historic Places in 2010.

References

Protected areas established in 1968
Native American history of Iowa
Protected areas of Mills County, Iowa
National Register of Historic Places in Mills County, Iowa
Archaeological sites on the National Register of Historic Places in Iowa
Woodland period